The 1st Kisei was the birth of a new Go tournament. Since this was the first year of the tournament, there was no set challenger or holder. From the 2nd edition on, there has been a playoff between challengers. At the time, it was the highest paying tournament there had ever been, and would be until the creation of the Ing Cup. Fujisawa Hideyuki's win would mark the beginning of a six-year defense of the Kisei title from 1977 to 1982.

Tournament 
Cho Chikun was eliminated in the preliminary stages by Yutaka Shiraishi. Eleven players competed in the main tournament: Yoshio Ishida, Masaki Takemiya Honinbo, Utaro Hashimoto, Eio Sakata and Hideo Otake Meijin were seeded into the quarter-finals. Masao Kato Judan, Hideyuki Fujisawa Tengen, Shuzo Ohira, Koichi Kobayashi, Rin Kaiho and Yutaka Shiraishi were matched up in the first round.

Hideyuki and Utaro reached the best of seven finals. Hideyuki took the first game, but lost the second. He then won three in a row and won his first of six straight titles.

Finals

References 

Kisei (Go)
1977 in go